Janez Burger (born 21 March 1965) is a Slovene film director, screenwriter and producer.

Life and career
Born in Kranj, Socialist Republic of Slovenia, Burger grew up in Železniki and now lives and works in Ljubljana . In 1986 he started his studies on Faculty of Economics in Ljubljana, but in 1990 quit this studies and moved to study at Film and TV School of the Academy of Performing Arts in Prague (FAMU) . In 1996 he graduated from film and TV direction at FAMU  and moved back to Ljubljana.

In Slovenia he established his theatre group Burgerteater. In 1997 he shot his first feature film Idle Running. The world premiere took place at the Karlovy Vary International Film Festival in 1999 in the international competition programme. Idle Running had been presented at more than 60 festivals worldwide and won the Grand Prize and the Findling Award in Cottbus.

In 2002, Burger shot his second film Ruins. The film had its world premiere on the International Film Festival Rotterdam in 2005.

Together with Jan Cvitkovič he established the production company Stara Gara in 2003 and was a producer of Cvitkovič's award-winning film Gravehopping.

In 2009 he shot his third feature film Silent Sonata, a film without dialogue. The film had its world premiere at the International Film Festival Rotterdam in 2011.

Filmography

Feature films 
Ivan (2017)
Silent Sonata (2010, 75 minutes), director and writer
Ruins (2004, 100 minutes), director and co-writer
Idle Running (1999, 90 minutes), director and co-writer

Short films 

On the Sunny Side of the Alps (2007, 15 minutes), short feature, director and writer
Matura 2000 (2000, 10 minutes), documentary, director and writer
Door (1989, 10 minutes), amateur short feature, director and writer

TV films 

Sonja (2007), feature TV drama, director
Novak family (2000) feature TV series, director
Sweet Little House(1998) short TV documentary, director and writer

References

External links 

1965 births
Living people
Slovenian film directors
Slovenian film producers
Slovenian screenwriters
Male screenwriters
Slovenian male film actors
Film people from Kranj